Samuel Alexander (1859–1938) was an Australian-born British philosopher.

Samuel Alexander may also refer to:

Samuel David Alexander (1862–1943), Croatian industrialist and philanthropist
Samuel N. Alexander (1910–1967), American computer pioneer
Samuel Thomas Alexander (1836–1904), founder of Alexander & Baldwin on Maui
Samuel Kern Alexander (born 1939)
Nova (Sam Alexander), Marvel Comics character
Samuel Giles William Alexander  (Sam Alexander), Marine
Chuffie Alexander (Samuel Alexander, 1902–1989), American baseball player

See also